İskilip District is a district of the Çorum Province of Turkey. Its seat is the town of İskilip. Its area is 1,170 km2, and its population is 29,643 (2022).

Composition
There is one municipality in İskilip District:
 İskilip

There are 64 villages in İskilip District:

 Ahlatcık
 Ahmetçe
 Akcasu
 Akpınar
 Aluç
 Aşağıörenseki
 Aşağışeyhler
 Asarcık
 Avhatyakası
 Başmakçı
 Beyoğlan
 Çatkara
 Çavuşoğlu
 Çetmi
 Çomu
 Çukurköy
 Dağkıyısı
 Derekargın
 Dereseki
 Doğangir
 Elmalı
 Eskiköy
 Gölköy
 Güneyaluç
 Hacıhalil
 Hallı
 Harun
 İbik
 İkikise
 İkipınar
 Karaağaç
 Karaburun
 Karaçukur
 Karagöz
 Karlık
 Karmış
 Kavak
 Kayaağzı
 Kılıçdere
 Kızılcabayır
 Kurusaray
 Kutluözü
 Kuzköy
 Kuzuluk
 Musular
 Onaç
 Örübağ
 Saraycık
 Sarıkavak
 Şehirkuruçay
 Seki
 Şeyhköy
 Seyirçay
 Soğucak
 Sorkun
 Suhilan
 Yalak
 Yalakçay
 Yanoğlan
 Yavu
 Yaylacıkseki
 Yenice
 Yerli
 Yukarıörenseki

References

Districts of Çorum Province